Brent David Brede (born September 13, 1971) is a former Major League Baseball outfielder.

Drafted by the Minnesota Twins in the 5th round of the 1990 Major League Baseball draft, Brede made his MLB debut with the Twins on September 8, . Brent Brede is now a high school teacher and coaches basketball at his alma mater.

External links

1971 births
Living people
Baseball players from Illinois
Minnesota Twins players
Arizona Diamondbacks players
Major League Baseball first basemen
Major League Baseball right fielders
American expatriate baseball players in Japan
Chiba Lotte Marines players
Nashville Sounds players
Elizabethton Twins players
Fort Myers Miracle players
Hardware City Rock Cats players
Kenosha Twins players
Salt Lake Buzz players
Tucson Sidewinders players